Vereda Tropical is a 1984 Brazilian telenovela created by Carlos Lombardi, and starring Lucélia Santos.

Plot 
Silvana (Lucélia Santos) is a simple girl, raised by her grandmother Da Paz since she was a small child, when she lost her parents. Operator of the CPP perfume factory, she stands out as the leader in the work. There she meets Victor, Oliva's son, owner of the factory, with whom initiates romance.

Cast

References

External links
 Vereda Tropical at IMDb

TV Globo telenovelas
1984 telenovelas
Brazilian telenovelas
1984 Brazilian television series debuts
1985 Brazilian television series endings
Television shows set in São Paulo
Portuguese-language telenovelas